María Hung (born 8 June 1960) is a Venezuelan swimmer. She competed in two events at the 1976 Summer Olympics.

References

External links
 

1960 births
Living people
Venezuelan female swimmers
Pan American Games competitors for Venezuela
Swimmers at the 1979 Pan American Games
Olympic swimmers of Venezuela
Swimmers at the 1976 Summer Olympics
Place of birth missing (living people)
20th-century Venezuelan women
21st-century Venezuelan women